Modravan (also Romanized as Modravān and Madarvān; also known as Madardān) is a village in Bezenjan Rural District, in the Central District of Baft County, Kerman Province, Iran. At the 2006 census, its population was 371, in 75 families.

References 

Populated places in Baft County